Constructivist Foundations is an international triannual peer-reviewed academic journal that focuses on constructivist approaches to science and philosophy, including radical constructivism, enactive cognitive science, second-order cybernetics, biology of cognition and the theory of autopoietic systems, and non-dualizing philosophy. It was established in 2005 and the editor-in-chief is Alexander Riegler (Free University of Brussels).

Content 
The journal publishes scholarly articles with empirical, formal or conceptual content, survey articles providing an extensive overview, target articles which are openly discussed in commentaries, opinions, and book reviews. In addition to regular issues, the journal occasionally publishes special issues.

Statistics 
(as of November 2019)

 42 issues
 613 authors
 1071 scholarly texts
 4,724 pages
 12,983 readers

Abstracting and indexing 
The journal is abstracted and indexed in the Arts & Humanities Citation Index, Current Contents/Arts & Humanities, Philosopher's Index, PhilPapers, Scopus, and Education Research Complete.

History 
The inaugural issue of Constructivist Foundations was presented at the 2005 meeting of the American Society for Cybernetics.

Originally, the articles in CF were meant to explore mainly von Glasersfeld's radical constructivism. The scope expanded to include "constructivist approaches.""In very general terms, constructivist approaches can be said to support the idea that mental structures such as cognition and perception are actively built by one's mind rather than passively acquired. They emphasize the primacy of the cognitive system and its organizational closure. In the understanding of constructivism, cognition is not about creating representations of a mind-independent reality but constructing reality."

See also 
 Constructivist epistemology
 Autopoiesis
 Cybernetics
 Enactivism
 Neurophenomenology
 Heinz von Foerster
 Ernst von Glasersfeld
 Ranulph Glanville

References

External links 
 
 

Philosophy journals
21st-century philosophy
Constructivism
Triannual journals
English-language journals
Publications established in 2005